Claude Dempsey was a New Zealand rugby league player who represented New Zealand.

Playing career
An Auckland representative, Dempsey played for New Zealand in one Test, starting at Fullback against the touring Great Britain Lions on 15 August 1936.

References

Living people
New Zealand rugby league players
New Zealand national rugby league team players
Auckland rugby league team players
Newton Rangers players
Rugby league fullbacks
Place of birth missing (living people)
Year of birth missing (living people)